According to the post-1900 publications of theosophy, Sanat Kumara is an "Advanced Being" at the Cosmic level of initiation who is regarded as the "Lord" or "Regent" of Earth and of humanity. He is thought to be the head of the Spiritual Hierarchy of Earth who dwells in Shamballah (also known as 'The City of Enoch'). According to the adherents to the Ascended Master Teachings, Shamballah is a floating city manifested on the etheric plane somewhere above the Gobi Desert in the borderlands of Mongolia.

Sanat Kumara is a mythical religious figure often referred to as an advanced human master with a consciousness far evolved from a human master as a master human is from an animal. His consciousness, age and experience of cosmic and interplanetary life and deity far exceeds that of a human master.

In Theosophy, the Great White Brotherhood is a spiritual "fraternity" of Ascended Beings, which was founded by and is still directed by Sanat Kumara. Presently he is supported in his role as the head of planet Earth and of Shamballah by a number of Avatars, most notably Buddha and Maitreya. According to Elizabeth Van Buren, the Brotherhood once maintained (earthly) headquarters hidden in a remote valley near a sacred lake in old Tibet, until relatively recently, when, possibly due to the surmised threat of Communist China, they withdrew, allegedly through tunnels to an alternative earthly location in Peru, where they are still reported as having an earth base (circa 1985).

These authors believe that Sanat Kumara is the founder of this Great White Brotherhood, which is composed of Masters of the Ancient Wisdom (called in the Ascended Master Teachings Ascended Masters) and volunteers from other worlds who have joined to advance spiritual evolution on Earth.

In Hinduism

Sanat Kumara appears as a rishi in the Hindu religious text the Chandogya Upanishad. A shrine to Sanat Kumara which attracts and unites people of all religions and faiths is situated in the town of Kataragama, Sri Lanka. In Sanskrit, "Sanat Kumara" is "Eternal Youth" (from Sanat "eternal", Ku "with difficulty" and Mara "mortal").

Shamballa in Buddhism – home of the King of the World

Shambhala (Tib. bde 'byung) in Vajrayana Buddhism (the religion of Tibet) is a Sanskrit term meaning "place of peace/tranquility/happiness". Gautama Buddha is said by Vajrayana Buddhists to have taught the Kalachakra tantra on request of King Suchandra of Shambhala; the teachings are also said to be preserved in Shamballa.  The Stanzas of Dzyan from which Madame Blavatsky claimed to have gotten the information in The Secret Doctrine are believed by some scholars to have been a mistranslation of words Kalachakra tantra (rGyud-sde in Tibetan).

In Theosophy

Sanat Kumara  was mentioned briefly  by the theosophist Helena Blavatsky. She claimed he belonged to a group of beings, the "Lords of the Flame", whom Christian tradition has presented as Lucifer and the fallen angels.

Sanat Kumara gained greater prominence when Blavatsky's close friend and colleague Charles W. Leadbeater wrote that Sanat Kumara was the "King" or Lord of the World, and the head of the Great White Brotherhood of Mahatmas who had revealed the principles of theosophy.

Later authors who draw from Theosophical teachings such as Alice Bailey and Elizabeth Clare Prophet have added to the story with further details. He is usually depicted as having the appearance of a 16-year-old boy, said to be the incarnation of the Will of the Logos, and purportedly possesses an unaging body not born of mortal woman.

The Descent of Sanat Kumara and the Lords of the Living Flame from Venus
C.W. Leadbeater and later adherents of Theosophy such as Alice A. Bailey believe that Sanat Kumara descended from the etheric plane of the planet Venus to Earth 18,500,000 years ago (A.E. Powell gives a figure of 16,500,000 years ago; Elizabeth Clare Prophet of Church Universal and Triumphant does not give a specific date but says it was a minimum of 2,500,000 years ago). In Theosophy, the beings that helped Sanat Kumara organize the expedition from Venus are called the "Lords of the Flame".  C.W. Leadbeater and Annie Besant said that Sanat Kumara brought 30 "Lords of the Flame" with him from Venus to help him set up his colony.

It is maintained in most of these versions of Theosophy that Venus, the 'Planet of Love', is the most spiritually advanced planet of the Solar System. The beings living on the etheric plane of Venus are said to be hundreds of millions of years ahead of us in their spiritual evolution. It is said that the governing council of Venus – the Seven Holy Kumars – sent one of themselves, Sanat Kumara, here to guide us.

City plan of Shamballa
The main temple of Shamballa is claimed to be topped with a golden dome and is surrounded by seven smaller temples—one for each of the seven rays. These temples are located on a number of wide boulevards resembling the Champs-Elysees.

Appellations (titles) of Sanat Kumara
The most common title attributed to Sanat Kumara in the Theosophical religious tradition is "Lord of the World". C.W. Leadbeater also states that an important duty of Sanat Kumara is to participate in an elaborate ritual every Wesak (the Full Moon of May) led by Gautama Buddha, and also participated in by the Maitreya (the being Theosophists identify as Christ), in which cosmic energy is focused from the "Solar Logos" to Earth in order to keep our planet's cosmic energy in balance.  The ritual is said to take place in a ravine in southern Tibet (the Frontispiece of Leadbeater's book The Masters and the Path has a picture of the ritual taking place) and, it is stated by Leadbeater, can be viewed by in the etheric body or in the physical body by those who have etheric sight.

Lady Master Venus
The Bridge to Freedom, Church Universal and Triumphant and all other "Ascended Master Teachings" organizations believe that Sanat Kumara has a Divine Complement (Twin Flame) (i.e., a celestial wife) – Lady Master Venus – the New Age "Goddess of Love".

Lady Master Meta

According to the Ascended Master Teachings, Sanat Kumara and the Lady Master Venus have a daughter named the Lady Master Meta who they brought with them from Venus.  She is said to have incarnated as an Avatar in Atlantis (where she served as the high priestess at the Temple of Healing) and in Sassanian Persia, where she married a mortal and had three children.  In the Ascended Master Teachings, she is revered as the Goddess of Healing and is the patron deity of doctors and nurses.

Master Cha Ara

According to the Ascended Master Teachings, the Master Cha Ara
was originally one of the three children of Lady Master Meta when she incarnated as an Avatar in Sassanian Persia.  He became a master alchemist who formulated an elixir of immortality made from rose petals, tea leaves from McLeod Ganj and other ingredients.  This enabled him to quickly achieve ascended masterhood.  He uses small amounts of the elixir to heal people.  He is the protector of all Zoroastrians.  He works with St. Germain to bring about the New Age in the West Americas.  Lady Master Meta's husband and her other two children from her descent as an Avatar to Sassanian Persia have also become ascended masters but their names have not yet been revealed.

Lady Master Nada

In the Ascended Master Teachings, a group of religions based on Theosophy, Lady Master Nada is the "Chohan of the Sixth Ray" (see Seven Rays), and is the Ascended Lady Master governing humanity's development of the Divine Qualities of Ministration, Service, and Peace. The colors of her Ray are purple and gold, and also ruby.

She is also considered a Member of the Karmic Board; she handles the appeals of those on the third ray.  She is believed by those adherent to the Ascended Master Teachings to have succeeded the previous Chohan, the Master Jesus / Sananda Buddha, on January 1, 1956, when she is said to have fully taken on the Office of Chohan of the Sixth Ray., thus advancing from the fifth to the sixth level of initiation.  She primarily serves at Arabian  Retreat in the Arabian Peninsula, northeast of the Red Sea. Nada serves there with the Brothers and Sisters of the Indigo Cape, as well as with Jesus, his Mother Mary and El Samyam, the  Chief of the Arabian Council. She also serves at The Rose Temple, located on the etheric plane above New Bedford, Massachusetts. Designed after the pattern of a rose, with each "petal" being a room, this Retreat is the etheric counterpart of the "Temple of Love" on Atlantis where Nada once served as a High Priestess.  In another human incarnate life in Atlantis, she was a lawyer. She was described as having raised her body and Ascended approximately 2,776 years ago.

Masters of the Ancient Wisdom

According to  the "I AM" Activity, the Church Universal and Triumphant and others, the Ascended Masters (The great beings the original Theosophists called the "Masters of the Ancient Wisdom"), such as the Master Jesus, Saint Germain, Megha Alcorn aka Megan Sebastian on Earth,   Kuthumi, Hatton, Gopal Das and others are working for the Spiritual Hierarchy of our planet, under the leadership of Sanat Kumara, Gautama Buddha, and Maitreya.  Many theosophists believe the "Masters" utilize the cosmic power of the Seven Rays to advance the Plan of the Masters to encourage the continual advance of civilization on Earth toward higher levels of consciousness. One of the beliefs of adherents of these belief systems is that the Masters of Wisdom have united together in an organization called the Great White Brotherhood.

Referred to as the manifestation of the 'Solar Logos'

The Theosophist A.E. Powell stated that Sanat Kumara (whom he refers to as the Lord of the World) is in continuous telepathic rapport with ANNA / Gaia, the Spirit of the Earth (i.e., the Planetary Logos – equivalent to the goddess known in some religions as Gaia or as Prithivi in Hinduism).

The council chamber of the Lord of the World

According to the Alice A. Bailey material, Sanat Kumara conducts business in an enormous room in his palace called The Council Chamber of the Lord of the World.  It is here that he regularly meets with Maitreya, the Maha Chohan, Djwal Khul, St. Germain, the Master Jesus and the other Masters of the Ancient Wisdom, of which it is said there are 24 principal council members, to assess the progress being made in implementing The Plan of the Masters to bring the human race to higher levels of consciousness.  According to C.W. Leadbeater, it is also here that he periodically personally receives ambassadors from other solar systems.

Sanat Kumara's cosmic bureaucracy

According to the Alice A. Bailey material, Sanat Kumara has many assistants who help him in his arduous task of spiritually governing Earth as its presiding Regent. 
These include The Watcher (also called the Silent Watcher or the Great Silent Watcher), whose function it is to continually watch the Akashic records and download daily all the information on them relevant to the life waves of Earth and forward it to the Custodian of the Hall of Records. (the Watcher is part of a special race of beings who fulfill this function that are posted on planets throughout the Cosmos ); the Lords of Karma – Alice A. Bailey mentioned three Lords of Karma but did not name them; they are called in the Ascended Master Teachings the Karmic Board and they are stated to number seven and each of them is identified by name: The Great Divine Director (1st ray), The Goddess of Liberty (2nd ray), Lady Master Nada (3rd ray), Cyclopea (4th ray), Pallas Athena (5th ray), Lady Master Portia (6th ray), and Kwan Yin (7th ray).

Omri-Tas, Ruler of the Violet Planet

Omri-Tas, the Ruler of the Violet Planet, is a Galactic level Ascended Master (Spiritual Hierarchy, Cosmic Beings) who with his celestial mate, Irmo-Sat, is Sanat Kumara's violet flame supplier.  The violet flame is composed of a special type of etheric matter particles, which may plausibly be called violetrons,  that are capable of cleansing bad karma.   Omri-Tas rules a planet on the etheric plane called the Violet Planet, which is apparently several dozen to several hundred light years from Earth.  The Violet Planet is one of many throughout the Cosmos that serve as reservoirs for the violet flame.  Omri-Tas is the ruler of the Violet Planet that is closest to Earth and which is responsible for transmitting the violet flame from the Great Central Sun of the Cosmos via the Galactic Logos to planets in Ursa Major (Our sector is reputedly 'Sector Nine' of the 48 Sectors in this spiral Galaxy).  Omri-Tas or one of his representatives periodically teleports from the Violet Planet to Shamballa with canisters of violet flame to replenish the violet flame in the large circular pool in the Temple of the Violet Flame in Shamballa (In return for the violet flame. Sanat Kumara assigns to his care and tutelage worthy initiated Adepts/Chelas for etheric transport to their next assignments.

Benjamin Creme's views
Benjamin Creme subscribes to the modern esoteric view that Nordic aliens (like those mentioned by George Adamski – Creme accepts Adamski's sightings as valid.) pilot flying saucers from the Way-Station on Venus that is thought to exist on the etheric plane (Esotericists believe that since the Venusians' civilization is on the etheric plane, the planet's heat doesn't affect them) and are capable of stepping down the level of vibration of themselves and their craft to the slower level of vibration of the atoms of the physical plane.

Creme's disciples believe that there is regular flying saucer traffic between Venus and Shamballa as well as other locations on Earth, especially areas where crop circles appear.  Creme's acolytes believe that Shamballa is equipped with an astrodrome as well as with numerous flying saucer landing pads attached to the tops or the sides of the buildings to accommodate the heavy flying saucer traffic from Venus.  Since Shamballa is envisioned as a floating city about five miles above the surface of the earth on the etheric plane, there are also numerous entrances in the basements of the buildings, where flying saucers can enter from the bottom of the city and park in spacious flying saucer parking garages provided in the basement levels of the buildings. In addition, says Creme, the Venusians have cigar-shaped mother ships up to four miles long to accommodate the transport of multiple individual flying saucers to and from Venus. According to Creme, sometimes flying saucers from places more distant than Venus, such as from Mars, the Moons of Jupiter, Uranus, Sirius, the Pleiades, and beyond, fly in to pay a visit at Shamballa.  Since, according to Creme, the Venusians flying saucer designers outsource the actual construction of their flying saucers to the Martians (who are said to dwell on the etheric plane of Mars), whom he describes as the "master engineers of the solar system",

Ashtar Galactic Command Flying Saucer Fleet
The Master Ashtar was first incorporated into the Ascended Master Teachings by Joshua David Stone in the early 1990s, based on his incorporation of the early 1980s revelations of the medium Tuella into his own teachings. Stone had already begun teaching in 1993, based on the early 1980s revelations of Tuella, that the Master Jesus, under his galactic name Sananda (the name, Stone stated, he adopted after his resurrection), works with Commander Ashtar, flying with Pallas Athena in their own flying saucer within the Ashtar Galactic Command flying saucer fleet as its Commander-in-Chief. According to Stone, another name used by Commander Ashtar to denote his flying saucer fleet is The Airborne Division of the Great White Brotherhood. Although the Ashtar Command is ultimately under the titular authority of Sanat Kumara, the Master Jesus in consultation with Pallas Athena and Ashtar, make all the day to day command decisions.

According to some, The Ashtar Command is simply a modern concept of the Sumerian/Babylonian goddess and deity Astarte/Ishtar/Isis and her entourage whose assigned function is to protect an evolving mankind from the Satanic forces, then extant, on this planet, that sought to usurp the Earthly Regency of the local Ascended Masters in their role of protecting and engendering Divine Law upon the Earth until the arrival, at 'The Meridian of Time' of 'The Son of God'... Jesus/Sananda and his incarnation of 'The Christ Being'.

Lourene Altiery, also known as Karita to her followers, is an Ascended Master Teachings teacher originally from Joliet, Illinois who now resides in Sun Lakes, Arizona – she set up her website in 2001.  According to Altiery, there are four Masters originally from the Spiritual Hierarchy Cosmic beings said to be patrolling near Ashtar Galactic Command Flying Saucer Fleet who are now permanently stationed on Shamballa.  These are the Masters Ballerian, who is the proprietor of a flying saucer repair facility in Shamballa called God's Garage; Kumad, an expert linguist who helps the Keeper of the Scrolls decipher and interpret ancient manuscripts; Ashlem,  a Tibetan Master who resides at the Hall of Records and helps people decipher their past lives by assisting them in accessing the Akashic records; and Sutko, the "space detective", who helps the Master K-17 solve unusually difficult cases.  Elements of the Ashtar Galactic Command Flying Saucer Fleet sometimes dock at Shamballa so the flying saucer crews can go on 'shore leave'.

Theosophical reply to Christian criticism
In the glossary of in the back of the book Alchemy, which Elizabeth Clare Prophet claims was dictated to her by Kuthumi, Satan and Sanat Kumara are clearly distinguished as two different and opposed beings—Satan working for evil and Sanat Kumara for good.

Skeptical view
The scholar K. Paul Johnson maintains that the "Masters" that Madame Blavatsky wrote about and produced letters from were actually idealizations of people who were her mentors. However, Sanat Kumara, although mentioned in passing by Madame Blavatsky, was never mentioned by her as an important "Master" that Blavatsky claimed to have met.  He was first presented, under the name Lord of the World, as the head of the "Masters" by C.W. Leadbeater in his 1925 book The Masters and the Path.

See also
A Treatise on White Magic
Afterlife (video game)
Erdgeist
God the Father
Hodgson Report
Mother goddess
UFO religion

Notes

Further reading
 Bailey, Alice A.  The Treatise on White Magic New York:1934—Lucis Publishing Co. (It is stated on page 378 that the city of Shamballa was founded 18,500,000 years ago.)
 Leadbeater, C.W.  The Masters and the Path  Adyar, Madras, India: 1925—Theosophical Publishing House (in this book, Sanat Kumara is referred to as Lord of the World.) (See web link to complete text of this book below.)
 Powell, A.E. The Solar System London:1930—The Theosophical Publishing House, London, Limited.  A complete outline of the Theosophical scheme of evolution.  (See Chapter XXXIV [pages 216–218], "The Coming of the Lords of Venus" Note: In these pages, it is stated that the Lords of Venus came to Earth 16,500,000 years ago.)
 Prophet, Mark L. and Elizabeth Clare.  Lords of the Seven Rays Livingston, Montana, U.S.A.:1986 
 Prophet, Mark L., and Elizabeth Clare. The Opening of the Seventh Seal: On the Path of the Ruby Ray. Malibu, California: Summit University Press, 1989. – self-published through their Summit University Press
 Dr. K. Parvathi Kumar - The Teachings of Sanat Kumara, 2009-Dhanishta

External links
The Saint Germain Foundation , Original publisher of Ascended Master Teachings beginning in 1934
 Theosophical Society, The original source of information about the Masters
 Let us Reason (Fundamentalist Christian anti-New Age mission site):

Ascended Master Teachings
Masters of the Ancient Wisdom
Characters in Hindu mythology
Venus in culture